The Visual 1050 was an 8-bit desktop computer sold by Visual Technology in the early 1980s. The computer ran under the CP/M operating system and used 2 400KB, 5¼, SSDD, 96tpi floppy disk drives (TEAC FD-55E) for mass storage with an optional 10Mb external Winchester hard disk drive.  In addition to the Zilog Z80 processor clocked at 4 MHz, the Visual 1050 also included a MOS Technology 6502 used as a graphics coprocessor.

Overview

The Visual 1050 featured a dual-processor architecture; Z80A processor as the main CPU and a 6502 to drive the display.

Memory: 160K of RAM was included with the system.  128K of this was programmable and 32K reserved for use by the display processor.

Screen: The display unit was 640×300 pixel, 80×25 character (8×12 dot matrix) green monochrome CRT bit-mapped display.  The display offered programmable features which could be invoked from the main processing unit via a character-stream interface built in between the Z80 CPU and 6502 co-processor.

Communication ports An RS-232C serial port and Centronics parallel port.

Keyboard: Keytronic full stroke 93-key with numeric key pad & 17 function keys.

Software: The standard Visual 1050 shipped with CP/M Plus operating system, a CP/M source disk, a copy of WordStar word processor with MailMerge software, Microsoft Multiplan spreadsheet, Digital Research DR Graph charting software, Digital Research CBASIC computer language, and an RS-232C communications program.

Chipset: In addition to the Z80 and 6502, the system also included Intel 8255A PIO, Intel 8251A USART, Intel 8214 Programmable Interrupt Controller, Motorola 6845 CRT controller, Western Digital 1793 floppy disk controller, and OKI MSM5832 real time clock.

Options

The Visual 1050 optionally supported a 10MB Winchester hard-drive via a Xebec S1410 Disk Controller.

See also
Visual 50 - a video display terminal produced by Visual Technology

Sources

External links
Pictures and Specifications
April 1984 Sales Advertisement from BYTE Magazine
Technical Information, Manuals, and general system information

Microcomputers
Computer-related introductions in 1983
Personal computers
8-bit computers